is a player character in Square Enix's role-playing video game Final Fantasy VII. Created by character designer Tetsuya Nomura, he has since appeared in the CGI film sequel, Final Fantasy VII: Advent Children as well as other games and media in the Compilation of Final Fantasy VII series. As of Advent Children, Barret is voiced by Masahiro Kobayashi in Japanese and Beau Billingslea in English.

Barret is first introduced in Final Fantasy VII as an eco-terrorist, leading the group AVALANCHE to bomb Mako reactors in the fictional city of Midgar, so as to avenge the losses dealt him by the megacorporation Shinra Electric Power Company, the Planet's de facto world government, who operate under the pretense of saving the Planet. As the story progresses, Barret re-examines his efforts and focuses on pursuing the villain Sephiroth in an effort to protect the planet and the future of his adopted daughter, Marlene. Elements of the Compilation of Final Fantasy VII would later expand upon his character, detailing the character's history before and after the events of the original game.

The first black playable character in the Final Fantasy series, Barret's appearance, and sometimes profane speech has been heavily compared to that of the actor Mr. T. He is also considered to be the first true father figure in the series, for his relationship with his adoptive daughter Marlene. His character arc is also considered a deconstruction of a revenge story, as a former coal miner seeking vengeance through eco-terrorism before eventually realizing revenge is not the right motivation. The character has earned much praise, but also criticism and accusations of racism by some.

Conception and design
Designed by Tetsuya Nomura, Barret was present in Final Fantasy VII from its early development. Initially, the game was to have only three playable characters, with Barret one of those three, along with the protagonist Cloud Strife and the heroine Aerith Gainsborough. During a phone call to project director Yoshinori Kitase, it was suggested that at some point in the game, one of the main characters should die, and after much discussion as to whether it should be Barret or Aerith, the producers chose Aerith, as they felt Barret's death would be "too obvious".

Barret's name is based on the Japanese transliteration of the English word "bullet", and he was developed with the "Gunner" character class in mind. His attire consists of a jacket with torn sleeves, dark green pants, boots, a fingerless glove on his left hand, and metal bands surrounding his abdomen and left wrist. His left upper arm is covered by a bowgun; this was later changed by replacing his right hand with a prosthetic gatling gun (called a "Gimmick Arm") which he refers to as his "partner" in-game. He was originally planned to have a medallion around his neck, described as a gift from his deceased wife, but this was later changed to a set of dog tags.

When developing Advent Children, Nomura stated that because of the comparisons between Barret's original design and Mr. T, they decided to take it in a different direction for the film, implementing co-director Takeshi Nozue's suggestion to give him cornrows for his hair, while Nomura designed his face. Artist Yusuke Naora influenced the design as well, developing his attire, which originally consisted of white overalls, before instead having him wear him a down vest. Barret's arm tattoo was changed as well, although it retained the "skull and fire" motif of the original. Other aspects of his design included the loss of the metal bands around his body, a white sleeve extending from the middle of his right forearm to his elbow fastened by straps, a black band on his left forearm surrounded by a pink string and bow, and a fishnet shirt that ends in torn fibers below his waist. The dog tags were altered to a bullet and medallion supported by a chain around his neck, and three rings covered his left hand. His Gimmick Arm was modified into a robotic prosthetic hand, developed by Nomura, with the only guideline being "a huge, over-the-top gun that transforms in a huge, over-the-top way". Nozue stated that these specifics made it difficult to work with, and decided to conceal the hand's transformation sequence into the gun as much as possible. His Advent Children design was also planned to be used for the Final Fantasy VII remake, but the staff later decided to give every character in the party a new look.

When choosing a voice actor for the film, Nomura was initially unsure of whether to have Masahiro Kobayashi do the role of Barret or another character, Loz. Kobayashi described his performance as treating Barret as "unrefined [...] but also dependable and unique", trying to keep his "upbeat character and good outlook in mind". He tried to give him a booming, confident-sounding voice, though at times was instructed to "take it up a notch".

In the remake, Square wanted to show Barret as a mature person, contrasting him from the younger Cloud when interacting with others. In the English dub of the Final Fantasy VII remake, John Eric Bentley did the voice of the character. During localization of the game, Bentley did not know the exact media in which he would portray Barret but was sure it had to do with the remake. Bentley made research in order to portray Barret properly. He was aided by the translators for the Japanese version who gave him the context of the scenes he had to record. For him, one of the biggest challenges in his work was "representation" and claimed that Barret was more than a one-dimensional character. In regards to the story's mission to destroy the Mako Reactor 5, Square aimed to show Barret as a fitting leader for AVALANCHE as well as to show how his relationship with Cloud is improved across it.

Appearances

Final Fantasy VII
First seen in Final Fantasy VII in 1997, Barret is introduced as the leader of the eco-terrorist organization AVALANCHE. Situated in the city of Midgar, his group opposes the ruling company, Shinra, and their use of "Mako" energy as a power source, believing it to be killing the Planet. To this end, AVALANCHE bombs their Mako reactors, with the specific goal of saving the Planet. When the game begins, they have just hired the mercenary Cloud Strife at the behest of his childhood friend and AVALANCHE member Tifa Lockhart, nicknaming him "Spiky" in reference to his hairstyle. After the deaths of several members of AVALANCHE, Barret follows Cloud out of Midgar in pursuit of the game's villain, Sephiroth.

Along the way, he encounters a former friend of his, Dyne, armed in a manner similar to him, who forces Barret to fight him. Upon Barret defeating Dyne, Dyne kills himself. Through flashbacks it is revealed that Shinra had wanted to build a Mako reactor in his hometown of Corel, an idea Barret advocated. However, due to an accident at the plant, Shinra razed the town, killing Barret's wife in the process, and causing Barret and Dyne to flee with Dyne's daughter, Marlene. Cornered, Dyne slipped off a cliff and Barret grabbed his hand, but Shinra soldiers opened fire, and destroyed Barret's and Dyne's right and left hands respectively, causing the latter to fall to his presumed death. Barret adopted Marlene as his own daughter, had an "adapter" graft to his arm to interface with prosthetic weapons to aid in his combat against Shinra, and founded AVALANCHE. Dyne's death causes him to admit his grudge with Shinra is solely for revenge, with his earlier claims of "saving the world" meant only to convince himself he was fighting for the greater good. Barret eventually shifts his goal to actually wanting to save the Planet, doing so for Marlene's sake, and he helps Cloud and his allies defeat Sephiroth to prevent the Planet's destruction.

Early drafts of Barret's background featured subtle differences, such as Marlene intended as Barret's biological daughter, and his wife executed in front of him by a then-undecided Shinra executive. The attack on Corel was initially written to be due to the discovery of Mako energy and Shinra's desire to keep its existence a secret. His reunion with Dyne was also different, written to culminate in a duel between the two in Corel's ruins, while Cloud and the others fought to investigate Shinra soldiers.

Compilation of Final Fantasy VII
Barret appears in Before Crisis: Final Fantasy VII, a 2005 mobile phone-based prequel to the events of Final Fantasy VII, which shows the events prior to Corel's destruction. He helps the game's protagonists, the Turks, defend the Mako reactor, believing it to be the town's future. It is revealed that the reactor is under attack by the original AVALANCHE group, who are the cause of Shinra's attack upon the town. Unaware of their involvement, Barret uses their ideals to form his own branch of the group.

In 2005, Barret appeared in the CGI film Advent Children, which details the events two years after Sephiroth's defeat. Barret places Marlene in Tifa's care, travelling the world to rebuild the planet's infrastructure and find alternate power sources to replace Mako. He returns later to assist in combating the film's villains, the Remnants, and fight the summon creature Bahamut SIN. He later appears in a small role in the 2006 video game Dirge of Cerberus: Final Fantasy VII, set one year after Advent Children, where he helps the protagonist Vincent Valentine prevent Omega WEAPON from destroying the planet.

A novella entitled "Case of Barret" was released in 2007 exclusively for the "Limited Edition Collector's Set" DVD edition of Advent Children. Written by Kazushige Nojima as part of the On the Way to a Smile series, it details the events between Final Fantasy VII and Advent Children, examining Barret's reaction to his weapon and his belief that it made him a monster. At the conclusion of the story, Barret visits the creator of the adapter on his wrist and receives the prosthetic hand/gun combination seen in the film, reasoning that although he needs a hand, he also still needs a weapon to prevent others from having to fight. He then decides to return to Marlene.

Barret also appears as a spirit and Mii costume in Super Smash Bros. Ultimate.

Critical reception
Pat Holleman, in his book Reverse Design: Final Fantasy VII (2018), considers Barrett's story to be the clearest illustration of the game's central "theme of tragic survivorship" and "a deconstruction of a revenge story" in the sense that it "dismantles the idea of revenge in an insightful way". This is presented through Shinra's destruction of his coal mining hometown, Barrett seeking vengeance through militant environmentalism before eventually realizing revenge isn't the right motivation, and safeguarding a future for his adoptive daughter Marlene who is the only surviving connection to his past. William Hughes of The A.V. Club notes that Barret and his terrorist cell AVALANCHE are one of the few examples of "heroic pop culture terrorists" in video games, keeping the game politically relevant in a post-9/11 world.

IGN ranked Barret fourth on their 2006 list of best sidekick characters in video games, stating that he "took the videogame world by storm" when introduced and noting that his portrayal was also appealing, adding that his past made him a visibly loyal character. Joystiq named him one of twenty characters from the Final Fantasy franchise they wished to see in Square Enix' crossover fighting game Dissidia Final Fantasy, noting a preference for his use of profanity and citing his combat abilities as easily suitable for the game. Edge praised Barret's introduction as something "new" in the series, citing both his use of a gun and his "distinctively black" character, and further describing him as a "pseudo-nod" to similarly armed characters, such as Mega Man or Samus Aran, who in contrast were either robots or encased in armor.

Barret's portrayal in the Final Fantasy VII Remake was praised by Siliconera due to his constant interactions with Cloud and Tifa as well as how more humanized he is shown when Marlene is shown at risk. As a result, the site believes Square set the character a good potential for his role in future installments of the remake.

Controversy
Prior to the game's North American release, initial reactions to the character were positive, for representing African-Americans in a role-playing game, a genre where they were rarely represented. Following its North American release, Barret's comparisons to Mr. T in the media has resulted in both praise and criticism, with most of the criticism accusing the character of serving as a negative racial stereotype of African Americans. IGN argued in favor of this point, citing his use of "stilted slang" and stating that the character stands out amongst the cast because "his dialog is written as if it was run through a broken ebonic translator", further noting a trend in Japanese games to apply such dialogue to characters based on their skin color. Journalist Jeremy Parish and Next Generation reader Russell Merritt viewed the character as a racist representation, although both also argued that cultural gaps between Japan and the United States, plus the lack of American translators for Final Fantasy VII may have been contributing factors, arguing that the likeness between Barret and Mr. T was possibly an attempt to make a character that appealed to Americans, as the actor did.

In contrast, on 1UP.com, Parish argued in favor of Barret, noting that while on the surface he appeared to be the "worst kind of stereotype", he was a great character with complexity, having made "difficult decisions in his life, and agonized over his losses". Parish went further to describe Barret as the "first true father figure the [Final Fantasy] series had ever seen", noting his relationship with his adopted daughter. RPGamers content manager Shawn Bruckner took the discussion further, arguing that claims of Barret's presentation being racist was oversimplification of the character's portrayal, and stated that while he was in some aspects a stereotype, in others, such as his compassion towards his daughter or guilt regarding his past actions, he was not. He added that Barret "shows us that a black man speaking in 'ebonics' is not something to fear" and that his portrayal was not racist, but instead the opposite.

See also
 List of Final Fantasy VII characters
 List of black video game characters

References

External links
 Barret Wallace on the Final Fantasy Wiki

Amputee characters in video games
Black characters in video games
Characters designed by Tetsuya Nomura
Cyborg characters in video games
Fictional criminals in video games
Fictional eco-terrorists
Fictional mining engineers
Final Fantasy VII characters
Male characters in video games
Science fantasy video game characters
Square Enix protagonists
Video game characters introduced in 1997

ja:ファイナルファンタジーVIIの登場人物#バレット・ウォーレス